Hin und weg is the eighth studio album by German singer Xavier Naidoo, released via Naidoo Records on 19 July 2019 in German-speaking Europe. Upon its release, it debuted at number three on the German Albums Chart.

Track listing

Charts

Release history

References

External links
 

2019 albums
Xavier Naidoo albums